Vassiliki Kydonaki (born 26 March 1993), commonly known also as Vasso Kydonaki, is a Greek footballer.

External links 
 Profile at uefa.com
 

1993 births
Living people
Women's association football midfielders
Greek women's footballers
Greece women's international footballers
21st-century Greek women